Ganj Dar (also known as Kanj Dar, Konj Dar, and Konjedar) is a village in Kamazan-e Olya Rural District, Zand District, Malayer County, Hamadan Province, Iran. At the 2006 census, its population was 146, in 34 families.

References 

Populated places in Malayer County